= Arrun Soma =

New Zealand journalist

- Born: Wellington, New Zealand

Arrun Soma is a New Zealand journalist, media advisor and co-founder of Indian Origin Pride New Zealand. IOPNZ is an organisation that aims to support and uplift Indian LGBTQIA+ people, their families and communities.

== Early life and education ==
Soma was born in Wellington, New Zealand to parents Lalita and Prakash Soma. Soma is of Gujarati heritage. In 2003, Soma attended Victoria University of Wellington and studied Communication, Media Studies and Film Studies. Soma then attended The New Zealand Broadcasting School.

== Activism ==
Soma recounts difficulty in his early life, "being in the closet, as many would know, is a really dark, dark and lonely place. It's a place where you are on your own, you don't know quite what to do, who to interact with." It is through these personal experiences that Soma saw the need for support of intersectional communities of LGBTQIA+ people and Indian diasporic and migrant people. Indian Origin Pride New Zealand was previously known as Wellington Indian Pride (formed in 2020) until it expanded and changed its name to IOPNZ in 2022. Along with co-founder Shay Singh, Soma, through IOPNZ, organises events and peer support programmes for the rainbow Indian community.

== Personal life ==
In 2018 Soma married his long-term partner, Jacob Vollebregt in a blended Christian- Hindu wedding in Wellington. The couple have a son together, who was carried by one of their friends, who volunteered to be their surrogate.
